Epsilon Tau Pi Fraternity was founded in 1999 at the University of Dayton in Dayton, Ohio. Its objective is to provide a collegiate fraternity for Eagle Scouts at universities and colleges in the United States.

History
Epsilon Tau Pi fraternity was founded by Michael Hammes and Michael A. Mahon, who, with six other students at the University of Dayton, became the founding members of the Alpha chapter. All eight were experienced Eagle Scouts, which became the focus of the new organization. This group of eight formally commenced operation of Alpha chapter on April 28, 1999; This date is celebrated by the fraternity as its national Founder's Day.

In 2001, the Alpha chapter authorized the formation of a 5-member national executive board. The board serves to support and bolster the expansion of the fraternity, as well as to support existing collegiate chapters.

In 2003 the fraternity began to hold biennial convocations, where alumni and collegiate members alike could meet and conduct fraternity business. Officers and alumni delegates to the national executive board are elected at the convocation.

The Fraternity was incorporated in the State of Ohio on January 21, 2006.

The Epsilon Tau Pi Foundation, a charitable and educational 501(c)3 organization, was registered on December 19, 2011, to provide scholarship assistance.

While not a member of the ACHS, Epsilon Tau Pi has aspects of both an honor society and service fraternity, and is characterized by regular projects undertaken for the local communities where chapters are present.

Purpose
The fraternity was formed with several goals in mind. Foremost, the fraternity dedicated itself to upholding the high ideals of Scouting's Eagle rank. The fraternity enables its members to participate in and promote service to others, to Scouting, the community, their university, and the fraternity itself. Members of the fraternity must maintain strict academic standards, in addition to participation in individual, group, and chapter-wide service projects.

Epsilon Tau Pi was formed for five different purposes.
 To create a brotherhood of Eagle Scouts.
 To serve Scouting and the community.
 To uphold the principles of Scouting.
 To promote the achievement of the rank of Eagle Scout.
 To provide an example to all students of loyalty to the Alma Mater.

Membership
There are five classes of Membership: Candidate, Active, Honorary, Alumni and Advisory (Faculty).

Membership in Epsilon Tau Pi shall be open to all university students who have achieved the rank of Eagle Scout in Scouts BSA or have attained the highest award possible in their respective country’s scouting organization.

Membership is available to students at those institutions where the Fraternity has chapters, or who are attending nearby schools.

The Fraternity requires a Candidacy period of at least six and no more than ten weeks.

National Executive Board
The chairman of the national executive board (NEB) is elected by all members of the fraternity at convocation and serves as the chairman and chief executive officer of the fraternity.  The position was established in 2003, approximately two years after the formation of the board.

Past chairmen

Other elected positions on the NEB include vice-chairman, secretary, North Atlantic regional director, South Atlantic regional director, Midwest regional director, and North Central regional director.  Appointed positions on the NEB include national fraternity education officer (FEO), financial director, marketing director, and IT director.

Service

Merit Badge Colleges
One of the more prominent activities of the fraternity is the Merit Badge College (MBC) in support of local scouting troops. MBCs are annual events hosted by chapters or colonies of Epsilon Tau Pi, offering scouts the opportunity to earn merit badges not otherwise offered outside of summer camps. Badges such as Chemistry and Programming may be earned with the advantage of college-level facilities, to which scouts would not otherwise have access.

Alpha chapter (Dayton, Ohio) 
The MBC at Alpha chapter is an annual event held at the University of Dayton. The program is held in three Saturday morning sessions, and scouts may complete up to three merit badges during the course of the event. In 2008, over 400 scouts attended the event.

Beta chapter (Columbus, Ohio) 
The MBC at Beta chapter is an annual event held at Ohio State University.

Iota chapter (Pittsburgh Area, PA) 
The MBC at Iota chapter is an annual event held at Robert Morris University. The program is held in two Saturday morning sessions, and scouts may complete up to four merit badges during the course of the event. In 2016, over 200 scouts attended Iota's event.

Chapters & Colonies
The fraternity consists of ten active chapters, seven active colonies and one pending colony, all in bold. Four additional colonies have gone inactive for lack of membership and/or activity, indicated by italics.

References

External links
ETPi Foundation
Epsilon Tau Pi Official Website
Epsilon Tau Pi Alpha chapter
Epsilon Tau Pi Beta chapter

Honor societies
Associations related to the Boy Scouts of America
Student societies in the United States
1999 establishments in Ohio
Student organizations established in 1999
Boy Scouts of America